Zacišiai (or Zacišė, formerly) is a hamlet in Kėdainiai district municipality, in Kaunas County, in central Lithuania. According to the 2011 census, the hamlet has a population of 5 people. There was a manor before the Soviet era. Scenic birch tree alleys go along the roads to Zacišiai.

Demography

References

Villages in Kaunas County
Kėdainiai District Municipality